The men's shot put at the 2012 IPC Athletics European Championships was held at Stadskanaal Stadium from 24–29 July.

Medalists
Results given by IPC Athletics.

Results

F11

F12

F20

F32/33/34

F37

F38

F40

F42

F44

F46

F52/53

F54

F55

F56/57/58

See also
List of IPC world records in athletics

References

shot put
Shot put at the World Para Athletics European Championships